Loznica may refer to:
Loznica, a city in Serbia
Loznica (Višegrad), a village in the municipality of Višegrad in Bosnia and Herzegovina
Loznica (Bratunac), a village in the municipality of Bratunac in Bosnia and Herzegovina
Loznitsa, a town in Bulgaria
Loznica, Montenegro
Łoźnica, West Pomeranian Voivodeship, a village in Poland
Ložnica, a river in Slovenia